The quetzal (code: GTQ) is the currency of Guatemala, named after the national bird of Guatemala, the resplendent quetzal. In ancient Mayan culture, the quetzal bird's tail feathers were used as currency. It is divided into 100 centavos, or len (plural lenes) in Guatemalan slang. The plural is quetzales.

History
The quetzal was introduced in 1925 during the term of President José María Orellana, whose image appears on the obverse of the one-quetzal bill. It replaced the Guatemalan peso at the rate of 60 pesos = 1 quetzal. Until 1987, the quetzal was pegged to and domestically equal to the United States dollar.

Coins

In 1925, coins in denominations of 1, 5, 10 centavos,  and 1 quetzal were introduced, although the majority of the 1 quetzal coins were withdrawn from circulation and melted.  and 2 centavo coins were added in 1932. Until 1965, coins of 5 centavos and above were minted in 72% silver.  and 1 quetzal coins were reintroduced in 1998 and 1999, respectively.

The coins currently in circulation are disc-shaped and include Guatemala's national coat of arms on the obverse. The coins, and their reverse designs are:

1 centavo: Friar Bartolomé de las Casas 
5 centavos: the tree of liberty and the motto "LIBRE CREZCA FECUNDO (Grow free and fecund)"
10 centavos: a monolith from Quiriguá
25 centavos: an indigenous woman, Concepción Ramírez
50 centavos: Monja Blanca, the national flower
1 quetzal: a stylized dove, the word "Paz (Peace)", and the date “29 de Diciembre de 1996 (29 December 1996)”

Banknotes
The first banknotes were issued by the Central Bank of Guatemala in denominations of 1, 2, 5, 10, 20 and 100 quetzales, with  quetzal notes added in 1933. In 1946, the Bank of Guatemala took over the issuance of paper money, with the first issues being overprints on notes of the Central Bank.  Except for the introduction of 50 quetzal notes in 1967, the denominations of banknotes remained unchanged until  and 1 quetzal coins replaced notes at the end of the 1990s.

In the top-right corner of the obverse face of each banknote, the value is displayed in Mayan numerals, representing Guatemala's cultural history.

The Bank of Guatemala has introduced a polymer banknote of 1 quetzal on August 20, 2007, followed by a 5 quetzal polymer banknote on November 14, 2011.

Exchange rate

See also
 Economy of Guatemala

References

External links
 Banco de Guatemala 
 Images of Guatemalan coins  from the Banco de Guatemala page
 Banco de Guatemala currency in circulation
 The banknotes of Guatemala 

Currencies of Guatemala
Currencies introduced in 1925
Currency symbols